Érablière-du-Trente-et-Un-Milles Ecological Reserve is an ecological reserve of Quebec, Canada. It was established on November 26, 1992.

References

External links
 Official website from Government of Québec

Nature reserves in Outaouais
Protected areas established in 1992
1992 establishments in Quebec